Point Peter may refer to:

Point Peter, Arkansas, an unincorporated community
Point Peter, Georgia, an unincorporated community
Point Peter Creek, a stream in Georgia